Sharon Fichman and Monica Niculescu were the defending champions, but both chose not to participate.

Johanna Larsson and Jasmin Wöhr defeated Kristina Barrois and Anna-Lena Grönefeld in the final 7–6(7–2), 6–4.

Seeds

Draw

References 
 Main draw

ITF Roller Open - Doubles
2011 in Luxembourgian tennis
ITF Roller Open